Capila pieridoides, commonly known as the white dawnfly, is a species of hesperid butterfly found in India and Southeast Asia.

Range

The butterfly occurs in India in north-east Bengal and Assam and eastwards onto Myanmar (Dawnas). It is also found in Thailand and western China.

The type locality is northeast Bengal.

Status
It is considered rare.

Cited references

See also
Pyrginae
Hesperiidae
List of butterflies of India (Pyrginae)
List of butterflies of India (Hesperiidae)

References
Print

Watson, E. Y. (1891) Hesperiidae indicae: being a reprint of descriptions of the Hesperiidae of India, Burma, and Ceylon. Vest and Co. Madras.
Online

Brower, Andrew V. Z. (2007). Capila Moore 1866. Version 4 March 2007 (under construction). http://tolweb.org/Capila/95329/2007.03.04 in The Tree of Life Web Project, http://tolweb.org/

Capila
Butterflies of Asia
Butterflies of Indochina